Brayan Velasquez Garcia (born 8 May 1996) is a Honduran professional footballer who plays as a forward. He has represented Honduras at the 2013 FIFA U-17 World Cup.

Club career 
In August 2014, Velásquez made his professional debut with Club Deportivo Olimpia.

In February 2016, Velásquez was loan to Lobos UPNFM.

In 2017, Velásquez was loan to Juticalpa F.C.

International career 
In 2013, Velasquez represented Honduras at the FIFA U-17 World Cup where he played all matches. Honduras only made it to the quarter finals. Velasquez had two goals and one assist.

References

 Honduras through to U17 World Cup Concacaf - Monday 28 October 2013
 Honduras tops US - Earns World cup spot Concacaf - Sunday 14 April 2013
 Honduras beats El Salvador 5-2 (U17)  LA VOZ DEL PUEBLO: Las Selecciones Nacionales de Futbol de El Salvador Saturday 8 December 2012

External links 
 

Living people
1996 births
Honduran footballers
Association football forwards
Honduras international footballers
Juticalpa F.C. players